Mountelgonia pagana is a moth of the family Cossidae. It is found in north-eastern Rwanda. The habitat consists of a mosaic of wooded savanna, farmland and dry forests.

The wingspan is about 21.5 mm. The forewings are warm buff. The hindwings are glossy ivory yellow.

References

Moths described in 1909
Mountelgonia
Moths of Africa